In 2005, the Los Angeles Dodgers suffered from a rash of injuries to key players such as closer Éric Gagné, shortstop César Izturis and outfielder J. D. Drew and fell to their second worst record in Los Angeles history, finishing in fourth place in the Western Division of the National League. After the season, manager Jim Tracy and General Manager Paul DePodesta were both fired and the team was torn apart. This was also the last season to be broadcast on KCOP (13).

Offseason
 January 11, 2005: Acquired Dioner Navarro, William Juarez, Danny Muegge and Beltrán Pérez from the Arizona Diamondbacks for Shawn Green and cash.
 March 20, 2005: Acquired Jason Phillips from the New York Mets for Kaz Ishii.
 March 30, 2005: Traded David Ross to the Pittsburgh Pirates for cash considerations.

Regular season

Season standings

National League West

Record vs. opponents

Opening Day lineup

Notable transactions
 August 9, 2005: Acquired José Cruz Jr. from the Boston Red Sox for a player to be named later (Tony Schrager).

Roster

Starting Pitchers stats
Note: G = Games pitched; GS = Games started; IP = Innings pitched; W/L = Wins/Losses; ERA = Earned run average; BB = Walks allowed; SO = Strikeouts; CG = Complete games

Relief Pitchers stats
Note: G = Games pitched; GS = Games started; IP = Innings pitched; W/L = Wins/Losses; ERA = Earned run average; BB = Walks allowed; SO = Strikeouts; SV = Saves

Batting Stats
Note: Pos = Position; G = Games played; AB = At bats; Avg. = Batting average; R = Runs scored; H = Hits; HR = Home runs; RBI = Runs batted in; SB = Stolen bases

2005 Awards
2005 Major League Baseball All-Star Game
Jeff Kent starting second baseman
César Izturis reserve
Silver Slugger Award
Jeff Kent

Farm system 

Teams in BOLD won the League Championship

Major League Baseball Draft

The Dodgers selected 51 players in this draft. Of those, 13 of them would eventually play Major League baseball. They lost their first round draft pick as a result of signing free agent Derek Lowe but gained a supplemental first round pick and a second round pick as compensation for the loss of free agent Adrián Beltré.

The first round pick was right-handed pitcher Luke Hochevar out of the University of Tennessee. After a long and controversial negotiation period, Hochevar backed out on a deal to sign with the Dodgers and would re-enter the draft the following year where he signed with the Kansas City Royals.

While several members of this years draft class would make the Majors, none were more than role players.

References

External links 
2005 Los Angeles Dodgers uniform
Los Angeles Dodgers official web site 
Baseball-Reference season page
Baseball Almanac season page

Los Angeles Dodgers seasons
Los Angeles Dodgers season